2008 has seen many sequels and prequels in video games. New intellectual properties (IPs) include Army of Two, Dead Space, iRacing, Left 4 Dead, LittleBigPlanet, Mirror's Edge, Race Driver: Grid, and Spore.

Events

Business

Open to the public

Hardware and software sales

Worldwide
The following are the best-selling games of 2008 in terms of worldwide retail sales. These games sold at least  units worldwide in 2008.

Canada
 Based on figures from the NPD Group:
Video game console sales in Canada (first seven months of 2008)

Japan
 Based on figures from Enterbrain:
Video game console sales of 2008 in Japan (December 31, 2007 – December 28, 2008)

Best-selling video games of 2008 in Japan (December 31, 2007 – December 28, 2008)

 Based on figures from Dengeki:
Best-selling video games of 2008 in Japan (December 31, 2007 – December 21, 2008)

United States
 Based on figures from the NPD Group:
Video game console sales in the US (first six months of 2008)

Best-selling video games of 2008 in the US

 Based on figures from the NPD Group via IGN; the games' publishers are listed in brackets:
Best-selling video games of 2008 in the US (by platform)

 Based on figures from the NPD Group:
Best-selling console games of all time in the US (as of May 1, 2008)

Note: This list only includes games that were released after NPD started tracking video game sales data.

Other
 Based on figures from Enterbrain, GfK Chart-Track, and the NPD Group, respectively:
Best-selling video games in Japan, United Kingdom, and the United States combined (January–July 2008)

Best-selling video games in Japan, United Kingdom, and the United States combined (July–September 2008)

Game releases

Critically acclaimed titles
Metacritic (MC) and GameRankings (GR) are aggregators of video game journalism reviews.

See also
2008 in games

Notes

References

 
Video games by year